Salahuddin Ahmed is a politician from Chapai Nawabganj District of Bangladesh. He was elected a member of parliament from Chapai Nawabganj-2 in 1988 Bangladeshi general election.

Career 
Salahuddin Ahmed was elected a Member of Parliament from Chapai Nawabganj-2 constituency as an independent candidate in the 1988 Bangladeshi general election. He was defeated from Chapainawabganj-2 constituency as an independent candidate in the fifth parliamentary elections of 1991.

References 

Living people
Year of birth missing (living people)
People from Chapai Nawabganj district
Jatiya Party (Ershad) politicians
4th Jatiya Sangsad members